The MÁVAG Héja ("Hawk") was a Hungarian fighter aircraft based on the Italian Reggiane Re.2000. The 70 Reggiane Re2000s delivered from Italy were modified with Hungarian equipment and fitted with Hungarian-built Manfred Weiss WM K-14 engines. The Héja was re-designed for Hungarian manufacture as the Héja II and a further 203 were built by MÁVAG for the Magyar Királyi Honvéd Légierő (Royal Hungarian Air Force), which used them in operations against the Soviet Union alongside German units.

Design and development
In December 1939 seventy Reggiane Re.2000 fighters, purchased from Italy, were delivered to the Magyar Királyi Állami Vas-, Acél- és Gépgyárak, ("Royal Hungarian State Iron, Steel and Machine Works"), where they were modified into MÁVAG Héja I ("Hawk I") fighters. The original Piaggio P.XI engines were replaced by the Hungarian-built Manfred Weiss WM K-14 driving Hamilton Standard three-bladed, constant-speed propellers. The WM K-14 was a licensed copy of the French Gnome-Rhône 14K engine that necessitated a 1-foot 3-inch lengthening of the fighters' forward fuselage to restore the center of gravity to a safe position. The Piaggio engine was itself also a copy of the Gnome-Rhône 14K, which was more reliable than the Italian engines.

However, the aircraft also suffered from a number of drawbacks. The Hungarian and Italian chemical industries were not able to produce enough good insulation material for wing tanks, thus early planes (Héja I. and all of Italian Re.2000) flown with continuously leaking fuel tanks and late models (Héja II.) had rows of small tanks in the wing, therefore manufacturing complexity and weight of the plane has been increased. Yaw stability was poor and the Héja's predisposition to sideslip was very dangerous at low altitude (it killed István Horthy), moreover the subsequent mass increase of Héja II. has worsened this issue.

A decision was soon made to produce more Héja fighters under license in Hungary as the MÁVAG Héja II (Hawk II). The new Héja II was entirely Hungarian with locally produced airframes, engines and armament, which was changed to twin  Gebauer Motorgeppuska 1940.Minta GKM motor-driven machine guns in the fuselage nose with 300 rpg. The first MÁVAG Héja II took to the air on 30 October 1942 and MÁVAG built a further 203 Héja IIs for the Royal Hungarian Air Force, with the last aircraft completed on 1 August 1944.

Operational history

The Kingdom of Hungary was allied to Nazi Germany during World War II, with at least one Hungarian squadron flying the MÁVAG Héja in combat on the Eastern Front. However, most Héjas operated inside Hungary in an air defense role or as a trainer.

On 20 August 1942, personal tragedy struck the Hungarian Regent Miklós Horthy, when 37-year-old István Horthy, Horthy's eldest son, Deputy Regent of Hungary and a Flight Lieutenant in the reserves, was killed while flying Heja V.421 of 1/1 Fighter Squadron Royal Hungarian Air Force near Ilovskoye.

In 1943, 98 Héjas were produced and another 72 in 1944. They were regarded as no longer suitable for combat against modern Soviet fighters and should have served as fighter trainers only. The Luftwaffe was reluctant to re-equip its Hungarian ally: the deliveries of aircraft went primarily to front-line formations and there was still danger of a Hungarian-Romanian conflict. Moreover, Hitler held an extremely bad opinion of the Hungarian aviators. So, the Hungarian Air Force was forced to use the licence-built Reggiane.

The last offensive sortie of the Hejas took place on 2 April 1944, when 180 15th Air Force USAAF bombers, escorted by 170 fighters, bombed the Danube Aircraft Works in Budapest and other targets. The Fighter Control Centre dispatched one wing of Hejas from 1/1 Fighter squadron, along with a couple of Messerschmitt Me 210Cas and 12 Bf 109Gs. The Honvéd pilots claimed 11 American aircraft (six of them confirmed). USAAF pilots reported to have shot down 27 Hungarian aircraft, while only two Hungarians were killed.

Operators
  Kingdom of Hungary
 Royal Hungarian Air Force
 2 Vadászszázad based at Szolnok
 Század Héja
 1/2.Század 'Keresztes pók
 2/1.Század 'Keresztes pók
 1/1.Vadászszázad
 2/1.Vadászszázad
 1/1.Század Dongó,Önálló Vadász Osztály (OVO)

Specifications (Héja II)

See also

References

Further reading

 

1940s Hungarian fighter aircraft
Low-wing aircraft
Hungary–Italy relations
Single-engined tractor aircraft
Aircraft first flown in 1940